As-Sirāt ( aṣ-ṣirāṭ) is, according to Islam, the bridge which every human  who had ever lived must pass on the Yawm al-Qiyamah ("Day of Resurrection") to enter Paradise. It is mentioned in the Quran, and is described in hadith.

As-Sirāt is said to be thinner than a strand of hair and as sharp as the sharpest knife or sword (because of its danger). Below this path are the fires of Hell, which burn the sinners to make them fall. Those who performed acts of goodness in their lives are transported across the path in speeds according to their deeds leading them to the Hawd al-Kawthar, the Lake of Abundance.

Etymology
They were equally uncertain of its gender.

Background
On Judgement day, after the dead have been resurrected, assembled,  and judged by God, the saved and the damned now being clearly distinguished, the souls will traverse over hellfire via the bridge of As-Sirāt.  The faithful, will "move easily and swiftly across a broad path", led first of all by the Prophet Muhammad himself and other leading lights of the community on their way to paradise (Jannah);  those judged guilty of sin but still considered to be mu'minun (believers) will fall from the bridge into Hellfire (jahannam) but remain there only for a limited period of purgation; unbelievers, however, will find the bridge has become "sharper than a sword and thinner than a hair" and  darkness blinds their way.  Their inevitable fall from the bridge will be an "inescapable descent" into their fiery destination of everlasting punishment.

Quran
This specific event is not mentioned in the Quran but is said to based on verses Q.36:66 and Q.37:23-24, although both sets "are rather indefinite". Only Q.37:23-24 mentions hell in the form of al-jahīm. 
On this Day We will seal their mouths, their hands will speak to Us, and their feet will testify to what they used to commit.
Had We willed, We could have easily blinded their eyes, so they would struggle to find their way. How then could they see?
Q.36:65-66
˹They will be told,˺ “This is the Day of ˹Final˺ Decision which you used to deny.”
˹Allah will say to the angels,˺ “Gather ˹all˺ the wrongdoers along with their peers, and whatever they used to worship
instead of Allah, then lead them ˹all˺ to the path of Hell [ṣirāṭ al-jahīm]. 
And detain them, for they must be questioned.”
˹Then they will be asked,˺ “What is the matter with you that you can no longer help each other?”
Q.37:21-25
Neither set of verses mentions a bridge or falling into hell, but Ṣirāṭ al-jahīm "was adopted into Islamic tradition to signify the span over jahannam, the top layer of the Fire".

In the hadith about "the bridge" or a bridge to hell or a bridge between heaven and hell, or over hell.
According to one Sahih al-Bukhari hadith:
"... We, the companions of the Prophet said, "O Allah's Apostle! What is the bridge?' He said, "It is a slippery (bridge) on which there are clamps and (Hooks like) a thorny seed that is wide at one side and narrow at the other and has thorns with bent ends. Such a thorny seed is found in Najd and is called As-Sa'dan. Some of the believers will cross the bridge as quickly as the wink of an eye, some others as quick as lightning, a strong wind, fast horses or she-camels. So some will be safe without any harm; some will be safe after receiving some scratches, and some will fall down going into Hell. The last person will cross by being dragged over the bridge."

In other religions
"The idea of a bridge crossing to the underworld has found expression in a number of different religious traditions"
In Judaism, a version of this doctrine is espoused by Philo of Alexandria in De Somniis, where he interprets "Jacob's ladder" as symbolic of the aerial realm, the air between heaven and earth, through which departed spirits ascend before either united to God or falling back to earth to be reincarnated. The Zohar also seems to have a similar view. (Zohar 1, 99a & b) Zoroastrianism also has this idea. The Chinvat bridge, which occurs in the Gathas of Zarathushtra, has many similarities and is a close concept to As-Sirat. S. G. F. Brandon quotes the Dāstan-i Mēnōk-i Krat
" ... pursued by the malevolence of the evildoer Wrath who bears a bloody spear, (the soul) will come to the Bridge of the Requiter, lofty and dreadful, for thither must saved and damned alike proceed." The Chinvat Bridge is also referred to many times
in both Avestan and Pahlavi literature.

Certain forms of Christianity also feature a similar bridge or passage, such as the Brig of Dread in folk Western Christianity, or the passage through the aerial toll houses in Eastern Orthodoxy.

Manichaeism calls this path to heaven or paradise the "Pillar of Glory" and identifies it with the Milky Way. Like the versions of this doctrine in Philo and the Kabbalah, the Manichaean account entails reincarnation as a possibility resulting from falling off the path or turning back.

Cultural references
American science fiction author Frank Herbert adopted the idea for his novel Dune. In the Orange Catholic Bible, life is described as a journey across the Sirat, with "Paradise on my Right, Hell on my Left, and the Angel of Death Behind".

See also
Sirat al-Mustaqim
Jacob's Ladder
Chinvat Bridge
Vaitarna River (mythological)

Explanatory notes

References

Bibliography

External links
A dictionary of Islamic terms

Islamic eschatology
Mythological bridges
Mythological places
Sirat
Islamic terminology